Waterdrop or water drop may refer to:

 Drop (liquid)
 Tianjin Olympic Center Stadium in Tianjin, China, also known as the "Water Drop"
 Kelvin water dropper, a type of electrostatic generator
 Water dropped from an aircraft as part of Aerial firefighting
 "Waterdrop", a song by Leama & Moor from the 2006 album Common Ground
 Waterdrop, a 2005 Japanese adult DVD by Rio Natsume